Brideswell may refer to:
 Brideswell, Aberdeenshire, Scotland
 Brideswell, County Roscommon, Ireland
 Brideswell, townland of County Dublin, Ireland
 Bridewell (disambiguation)

Related concepts
 Saint Bride
 Holy well